Lu Bain (September 2, 1942 – February 4, 2011) was a Canadian football player who played for the Calgary Stampeders and Edmonton Eskimos. He played college football at the University of Oregon.

References

1942 births
2011 deaths
Players of American football from Alabama
American players of Canadian football
People from Jackson County, Alabama
American football running backs
Canadian football running backs
Oregon Ducks football players
Calgary Stampeders players
Edmonton Elks players
Players of Canadian football from Alabama